Coralliophila is a genus of sea snails, marine gastropod mollusks in the subfamily Coralliophilinae, the coral snails, within the family Muricidae, the murex snails and rock snails.

The genus Coralliophila is most probably polyphyletic   and should be restricted to the species most closely related to the type species. Species in the genus Hirtomurex, situated in the Indo-West Pacific are not clearly distinguishable from the species in the genus Coralliophila sensu lato (in the broad sense) found in the Eastern Atlantic.

Species

Species within the genus Coralliophila s.l. include:

 Coralliophila aberrans (C. B. Adams, 1850)
 Coralliophila abnormis (E.A. Smith, 1878)
 Coralliophila adansoni Kosuge & Fernandes, 1989
 Coralliophila aedonia (Watson, 1885)
 Coralliophila africana Smriglio & Mariottini, 2001
 Coralliophila ahuiri Cossignani, 2009
 Coralliophila alboangulata (E. A. Smith, 1890)
 Coralliophila amirantium E. A. Smith, 1884
 Coralliophila andamana Melvill, 1889
 Coralliophila atlantica E. A. Smith, 1890
 Coralliophila australis Oliverio, 2009
 Coralliophila basileus (Dautzenberg & Fischer H., 1896)
 Coralliophila bathus Oliverio, 2008
 † Coralliophila bracteata (Brocchi, 1814) 
 Coralliophila brevis (de Blainville, 1832)
 Coralliophila bulbiformis (Conrad, 1837)
 † Coralliophila burdigalensis (Tournouër, 1874) 
 Coralliophila cancellarioidea Oliverio, 2008
 Coralliophila candidissima Oliverio, 2008
 Coralliophila caribaea Abbott, 1958
 Coralliophila carnosa Kosuge, 1986
 Coralliophila caroleae D'Attilio & Myers, 1984
 Coralliophila clathrata (A. Adams, 1854)
 Coralliophila confusa Kosuge, 1986
 Coralliophila costata (Blainville, 1832)
 Coralliophila costularis (Lamarck, 1816)
 Coralliophila cumingii (H. Adams & A. Adams, 1864)
 Coralliophila curacaoensis Potkamp & Hoeksema, 2017
 Coralliophila curta Sowerby III, 1894
 Coralliophila elaborata H. Adams & A. Adams, 1863
 Coralliophila elvirae D'Attilio & Emerson, 1980
 Coralliophila erosa (Röding, 1798)
 Coralliophila erythrostoma E. A. Smith, 1890
 Coralliophila fearnleyi (Emerson & D'Attilio, 1965)
 Coralliophila fimbriata (A. Adams, 1854)
 Coralliophila flava Kosuge, 1985
 Coralliophila fontanangioyae Smriglio & Mariottini, 2000
 Coralliophila fragosa E.A. Smith, 1910
 Coralliophila francoisi Bozzetti, 2006
 Coralliophila fritschi (Martens, 1874)
 Coralliophila galea (Dillwyn, 1823)
 Coralliophila giton (Dautzenberg, 1891)
 Coralliophila guancha Smriglio, Mariottini & Engl, 2003
 Coralliophila hayesi Smriglio & Mariottini, 2001
 Coralliophila hotei Kosuge, 1985
 Coralliophila infantula Kosuge, 1985
 Coralliophila inflata (Dunker in Philippi, 1847)
 Coralliophila jarli Knudsen
 Coralliophila jeffreysi E. A. Smith, 1879
 Coralliophila juliamoralesae Smriglio, Mariottini & Engl, 2002
 † Coralliophila kaiparaensis (P. Marshall, 1918) 
 Coralliophila kalafuti (Petuch, 1987)
 Coralliophila kaofitorum Vega, Vega & Luque, 2002
 Coralliophila knudseni Smriglio & Mariottini, 2000
 Coralliophila latilirata Rehder, 1985
 Coralliophila leucostoma Kosuge, 1986
 Coralliophila liltvedi Kosuge, 1986
 † Coralliophila lividorupis (Laws, 1935) 
 Coralliophila luglii Smriglio & Mariottini, 2011
 Coralliophila macleani Shasky, 1970
 Coralliophila mallicki Ladd, 1976
 Coralliophila mandji P. A. Bernard, 1989
 Coralliophila marrati Knudsen
 Coralliophila meyendorffii (Calcara, 1845)
 Coralliophila mira (Cotton & Godfrey, 1932)
 Coralliophila mitraeforma Kosuge, 1985
 Coralliophila monodonta (Blainville, 1832)
 Coralliophila monterosatoi (Locard, 1897)
 Coralliophila nanhaiensis Zhang & Wei, 2005
 Coralliophila nivea (A. Adams, 1853)
 Coralliophila nodosa (A. Adams, 1854)
 Coralliophila norfolk Oliverio, 2008
 Coralliophila nukuhiva Oliverio, 2008
 Coralliophila nux (Reeve, 1846)
 Coralliophila orcuttiana Dall, 1919
 Coralliophila ovoidea (Kosuge, 1985)
 Coralliophila panormitana (Monterosato, 1869)
 Coralliophila parva (E. A. Smith, 1877)
 Coralliophila parvula Bozzetti, 2007
 Coralliophila patruelis (E. A. Smith, 1890)
 Coralliophila persica Melvill, 1897
 Coralliophila pulchella (A. Adams, 1854)
 Coralliophila radula (A. Adams, 1855)
 Coralliophila rashafunensis Bozzetti, 2018
 Coralliophila rhomboidea Kosuge & Oliverio, 2004
 Coralliophila richardi (Fischer P., 1882)
 Coralliophila robillardi (Liénard, 1870)
 Coralliophila roseocephala Kosuge, 1986
 Coralliophila rubrococcinea Melvill & Standen, 1901
 Coralliophila salebrosa H. Adams & A. Adams, 1863
 Coralliophila scala (A. Adams, 1854)
 Coralliophila scalariformis (Lamarck, 1822)
 Coralliophila scalaris (Brocchi, 1814)
 Coralliophila schioettei Smriglio & Mariottini, 2000
 Coralliophila sertata (Hedley, 1903)
 Coralliophila sofiae (Aradas & Benoit, 1876)
 Coralliophila solutistoma Kuroda & Shikama in Shikama, 1966
 Coralliophila squamosissima (Smith, 1876)
 Coralliophila squamulosa (Reeve, 1846 in 1843-65)
 Coralliophila suduirauti Smriglio & Mariottini, 2003
 Coralliophila tetragona Kosuge, 1986
 Coralliophila trigoi Mariottini, Smriglio & Rolán 2005
 † Coralliophila turneri Laws, 1941 
 Coralliophila vertigo (Kosuge, 1986)
 Coralliophila violacea Kiener, 1836
 Coralliophila wilsoni Pritchard & Gatliff, 1898
 Coralliophila xenophila Oliverio, 2008

The Indo-Pacific Molluscan Database also recognizes the following species with names in current use :
 Coralliophila morishimai Kuroda & Shikama in Shikama, 1966
 Coralliophila ohmurai Kosuge, 1985
 Coralliophila tokioi Kosuge, 1985
 Subgenus Coralliobia H. & A. Adams, 1853
 Coralliophila pterigostoma D'Attilio & Kosuge, 1988
 Subgenus Coralliophila H. & A. Adams, 1853
 Coralliophila arabica Melvill, 1898
 Coralliophila porphyroleuca (Crosse, 1870)
 Coralliophila tetragona Kosuge, 1986
 Subgenus Coralliofusus Kuroda, 1953
 Coralliophila acus (Kuroda, 1953)
 Coralliophila turrita Sowerby, 1888

The database of the Western Atlantic Marina Mollusca also mention the following species :
 Coralliophila pacei Petuch, 1987

 Species brought into synonymy 
 Coralliophila abbreviata auct. non Lamarck, 1816: synonym of Coralliophila galea (Dillwyn, 1823)
 Coralliophila abbreviata (Lamarck, 1816): synonym of Coralliophila erosa (Röding, 1798)
 Coralliophila acuti-tenuitas Settepassi, 1977: synonym of Coralliophila meyendorffii (Calcara, 1845)
 Coralliophila alboranensis Smriglio & Mariottini, 2003 : synonym of Coralliophila brevis (Blainville, 1832)
 Coralliophila alucoides (Blainville, 1829): synonym of Coralliophila squamosa (Bivona Ant. in Bivona And., 1838): synonym of Hirtomurex squamosus (Bivona Ant. in Bivona And., 1838)
 Coralliophila armeniaca D'Attilio & Myers, 1984: synonym of  Coralliophila abnormis (E.A. Smith, 1878)
 Coralliophila asperrima H. Adams & A. Adams, 1863: synonym of Coralliophila scala (A. Adams, 1854)
 Coralliophila babelis (Requien, 1848): synonym of  Babelomurex cariniferus (Sowerby, 1834)
 Coralliophila barclayana H. Adams, 1873: synonym of  Pterymarchia barclayana (H. Adams, 1873)
 Coralliophila basilium Penna-Neme & Leme, 1978: synonym of Babelomurex dalli (Emerson & D'Attilio, 1963)
 Coralliophila cantrainei Montrouzier [in Souverbie], 1861: synonym of  Coralliophila bulbiformis (Conrad, 1837)
 Coralliophila carinata Koroneos, 1979: synonym of Babelomurex cariniferus (Sowerby, 1834)
 Coralliophila confragosa H. & A. Adams, 1864: synonym of  Muricodrupa fiscella (Gmelin, 1791)
 Coralliophila coronata H. Adams, 1869: synonym of  Morula (Habromorula) coronata (H. Adams, 1869)
 Coralliophila crebrilamellosa (G.B. Sowerby III, 1913): synonym of Mipus crebrilamellosus (G. B. Sowerby III, 1913)
 Coralliophila deburghiae (Reeve, 1857) sensu Dall, 1889: synonym of Babelomurex dalli (Emerson & D'Attilio, 1963)
 Coralliophila deformis Lamarck: synonym of Coralliophila erosa (Röding, 1798)
 Coralliophila dissimulans Preston, 1904: synonym of  Pascula ozenneana (Crosse, 1861)
 Coralliophila emimarumai Kosuge, 1981 accepted as Coralliophila persica Melvill, 1897
 Coralliophila fax F. M. Bayer, 1971: synonym of Babelomurex fax (F. M. Bayer, 1971)
 Coralliophila fontanangioyi Smriglio & Mariottini, 2000  : synonym of  Coralliophila fontanangioyae Smriglio & Mariottini, 2000
 Coralliophila groschi Kilburn, 1977 : synonym of  Coralliophila erosa (Röding, 1798)
 Coralliophila incompta Berry, 1960 : synonym of  Attiliosa nodulosa (A. Adams, 1854)
 Coralliophila indica E.A. Smith, 1899 : synonym of Babelomurex indicus (E.A. Smith, 1899)
 Coralliophila isosceles Barnard, 1959  : synonym of  Mipus isosceles (Barnard, 1959)
 Coralliophila isshikiensis Shikama, 1971: synonym of Hirtomurex isshikiensis (Shikama, 1971)
 Coralliophila kawamurai Shikama, 1978 : synonym of Hirtomurex kawamurai (Shikama, 1978)
 Coralliophila lacerata (Deshayes, 1856): synonym of Babelomurex cariniferus (Sowerby, 1834)
 Coralliophila lactuca Dall, 1889: synonym of Coralliophila richardi (P. Fischer, 1882)
 Coralliophila lamellosa (Philippi, 1836): synonym of Hirtomurex squamosus (Bivona Ant. in Bivona And., 1838)
 Coralliophila latiaxidea Sowerby, 1893 : synonym of Lataxiena fimbriata (Hinds, 1844)
 Coralliophila madreporarum (Sowerby, 1822): synonym of Coralliophila monodonta (Blainville, 1832)
 Coralliophila miyukiae Kosuge, 1985: synonym of Mipus miyukiae Kosuge, 1985
 Coralliophila neritoidea (Lamarck, 1816): synonym of Coralliophila violacea (Kiener, 1836)
 Coralliophila orbignyana (Petit de la Saussaye, 1851): synonym of Coralliophila erosa (Röding, 1798)
 Coralliophila patula Settepassi, 1977: synonym of Coralliophila brevis (Blainville, 1832)
 Coralliophila priolana Settepassi, 1971 : synonym of Babelomurex tectumsinensis (Deshayes, 1856)
 Coralliophila profundicola Haas, 1949: synonym of Coralliophila aedonia (Watson, 1886)
 Coralliophila pyriformis Kira, 1959 : synonym of Coralliophila radula (A. Adams, 1855)
 Coralliophila retusa H. Adams & A. Adams, 1863 : synonym of Coralliophila costularis (Lamarck, 1816)
 Coralliophila rolani Bogi & Nofroni, 1984 : synonym of Nucella rolani (Bogi & Nofroni, 1984)
 Coralliophila rosacea (E. A. Smith, 1903): synonym of Mipus rosaceus (E. A. Smith, 1903)
 Coralliophila sentix Bayer, 1971: synonym of Babelomurex sentix (Bayer, 1971)
 Coralliophila spinosa Dall, 1925 : synonym of Babelomurex spinosus (Hirase, 1908)
 Coralliophila squamosa (Bivona Ant. in Bivona And., 1838): synonym of Hirtomurex squamosus (Bivona Ant. in Bivona And., 1838)
 Coralliophila stearnsiana Dall, 1919 : synonym of Coralliophila erosa (Röding, 1798)
 Coralliophila stearnsii Pilsbry, 1895 : synonym of Coralliophila squamosissima (E.A. Smith, 1876)
 Coralliophila suturalis A. Adams in H. Adams & A. Adams, 1853: synonym of Coralliophila erosa (Röding, 1798)
 Coralliophila tomlini van Regteren Altena, 1950 : synonym of Mipus tomlini (van Regteren Altena, 1950)
 Coralliophila turris Settepassi, 1977: synonym of Coralliophila squamosa (Bivona Ant. in Bivona And., 1838): synonym of Hirtomurex squamosus (Bivona Ant. in Bivona And., 1838)
 Coralliophila zuluensis Barnard, 1959: synonym of Coralliophila crebrilamellosa (G.B. Sowerby III, 1913)

References
 H. & A. Adams, 1853 [the Genera of Recent Mollusca, 1: 135; Type fixation discussed by Iredale, 1912, Proceedings of the Malacological Society of London, 10(3): 221]
 Kosuge S. & Oliverio M. 2004. Three new coralliophiline species from south west Pacific (Neogastropoda: Muricidae: Coralliophilinae). Journal of Conchology 38 : 147-153, Part 2
 Oliverio M. (2008) Coralliophilinae (Neogastropoda: Muricidae) from the southwest Pacific. In: V. Héros, R.H. Cowie & P. Bouchet (eds), Tropical Deep-Sea Benthos 25. Mémoires du Muséum National d'Histoire Naturelle 196: 481-585.
page(s): 485

External links

 Oliverio, Marco; Gofas, Serge, Coralliophiline diversity at mid-Atlantic seamounts (Neogastropoda, Muricidae, Coralliophilinae) ,  Bulletin of Marine Science, Volume 79, Number 1, July 2006 , pp. 205-230(26)

 
Coralliophilinae